Dmitri Sergeyevich Molchanov (born 1 October 2000) is a Russian football player. He plays for FC Dynamo Bryansk.

Club career
He made his debut in the Russian Professional Football League for FC Chertanovo Moscow on 11 August 2017 in a game against FSK Dolgoprudny. He made his Russian Football National League debut for Chertanovo on 29 July 2018 in a game against FC Baltika Kaliningrad.

He made his Russian Premier League debut for PFC Krylia Sovetov Samara on 7 July 2020 in a game against FC Arsenal Tula, replacing Dmitri Kabutov in the 84th minute.

References

External links
 
 
 
 Profile by Russian Professional Football League

2000 births
People from Nakhodka
Living people
Russian footballers
Russia youth international footballers
Association football forwards
FC Chertanovo Moscow players
PFC Krylia Sovetov Samara players
FC Dynamo Bryansk players
Russian Premier League players
Russian First League players
Russian Second League players
Sportspeople from Primorsky Krai